Dragones: destino de fuego (Known as its English title as: Dragons: Destiny of Fire) is a Peru CGI animated film produced by: Ana María Roca-Rey and animated and distributed by: Alpamayo Entertainment.

Plot
A tiny purple dragon named John John (originally named Sinchi), who was originally raised by an affectionate family of close-knit condors, who was always assumed that he was just a bit different looking from his feathered siblings. Eventually, the time comes for John John to strike out on his own and seek the answers to his many questions as he embarks on an adventure to discover his true identity, of his real origin. Of course, the world is a rather large place for such a little dragon, but he's not alone. He has the help of some new friends John John makes, as he can finally discover the secret to making the world a better place to live, for every living creature.

Voice cast
This is a film from Peru, so the language for this film was originally recorded in Spanish. However, for the English-speaking countries, this film has actually been dubbed into the English language. But there is currently no information regarding the English dubbing voice cast, nor its staff of the English dubbed version.

English dubbing staff
Date release: March 4, 2007 (Australia), April 8, 2008 (North America)
Media: DVD
Dubbing Director: Unknown
Translator: Unknown
Adjustments: Unknown
Dubbing Studio: Aronnax

References

External links

2006 films
2006 animated films
2000s Spanish-language films
Peruvian animated films
2000s adventure films
Peruvian fantasy films
2000s Peruvian films
Animated films about dragons